Yuriy Mykhaylovych Romenskyi (born 1 August 1952 in Mingachevir, Azerbaijani SSR) is a retired Soviet football player and a former FC Chornomorets Odesa goalkeeping coach.

Born in Azerbaijan Romensky settled in Ukraine since 1978 when he moved to Odessa after joining FC Chornomorets Odesa. He retired sometime in 1984 and then worked as a coach or football consultant. On the question "Who is the best Ukrainian goalkeeper?" he answered – "Yevhen Rudakov".

Honours
 Soviet Top League winner: 1980, 1981.

International career
Romensky made his debut for USSR on 19 November 1978 in a friendly against Japan. He played in a UEFA Euro 1980 qualifier (USSR did not qualify for the final tournament).

In 1979 Romensky played couple of games for Ukraine at the Spartakiad of the Peoples of the USSR.

References

External links
  Profile

1952 births
Living people
People from Mingachevir
Soviet footballers
Soviet Union international footballers
FC Chornomorets Odesa players
FC Dynamo Kyiv players
Soviet Top League players
Merited Coaches of Ukraine
Association football goalkeepers
Neftçi PFK players